Bill McGovern is an American football coach who is the defensive coordinator for the UCLA Bruins.

Playing career
McGovern played college football at Holy Cross where he was a four-year starter at defensive back. He set a career NCAA Division I-AA record with 24 interceptions. In 1984, during his senior year, he was named a consensus first team Division I-AA All-American.

Coaching career
It was announced on February 8, 2013, that McGovern had been hired by the Philadelphia Eagles as their outside linebackers coach.  He previously served as the defensive coordinator for Boston College for four years, a promotion after serving as linebackers coach for nine years before that.  During his previous two seasons as defensive coordinator, he coached two future NFL linebackers – Mark Herzlich and Luke Kuechly. Prior to working at Boston College, McGovern served as defensive backs coach at Pittsburgh from 1997 to 1999, at Boston College from 1994 to 1996 as defensive backs coach, at Massachusetts in 1993 as defensive coordinator and from 1988 to 1990 as defensive backs coach, at Holy Cross from 1991 to 1992 and 1986-1987 as defensive backs coach and assistant defensive backs coach respectively, and at Pennsylvania as freshman coach in 1985.

On January 23, 2016, McGovern was hired as linebackers coach for the New York Giants. After the firing of Ben McAdoo, McGovern was retained in his role by new head coach Pat Shurmur.

McGovern was hired by the Chicago Bears as the inside linebackers coach under new defensive coordinator Sean Desai on January 30, 2021. He was not retained following the firing of head coach Matt Nagy and the subsequent hiring of Matt Eberflus after the conclusion of the 2021 season.

On February 16, 2022, McGovern re-united with Chip Kelly when he was hired as the defensive coordinator for the UCLA Bruins.

References

External links
 New York Giants profile

Living people
Year of birth missing (living people)
Holy Cross Crusaders football players
Philadelphia Eagles coaches
New York Giants coaches